Manuel F. Cohen (October 9, 1912 – June 16, 1977) served as chairman of the U.S. Securities and Exchange Commission between 1964 and 1969 and also served as a member from 1961 to 1969.

Born in Brooklyn, he was a graduate of Brooklyn College (B.S. 1933).

During his tenure, the breadth of the prohibitions against insider trading, which had been developed earlier under Chairman William L. Cary, grew substantially as the SEC began to bring the key cases that developed the theories of insider trading on which the SEC relies today.

His daughter Susan Cohen married future United States federal judge Paul D. Borman in 1964.

References

External links
 32nd Annual Report of the Securities and Exchange Commission
 The Saxe Lectures (1976/77) - THE WORK OF THE COMMISSION ON AUDITORS' RESPONSIBILITIES, Manuel F. Cohen (March 8, 1977)

Brooklyn College alumni
Members of the U.S. Securities and Exchange Commission
People from Brooklyn
1912 births
1977 deaths
Kennedy administration personnel
Lyndon B. Johnson administration personnel
Nixon administration personnel